The 9th Parliament of Navarre was a meeting of the Parliament of Navarre, the regional legislature of Navarre, with the membership determined by the results of the regional election held on 24 May 2015. The parliament met for the first time on 17 June 2015.

Election
The 9th Navarrese parliamentary election was held on 24 May 2015. At the election the conservative and unionist Navarrese People's Union (UPN) remained the largest party in the parliament but fell well short of a majority.

History
The new parliament met for the first time on 17 June 2015 and elected Ainhoa Aznarez (Podemos) as President of the Parliament of Navarre.

Other members of the Bureau of the Parliament of Navarre were also elected on 17 June 2015: Unai Hualde (GB), First Vice-president; Alberto Catalán (UPN), Second Vice-president; Maiorga Ramirez (EHB), First Secretary; Óscar Arizcuren (UPN), Second Secretary.

Uxue Barkos (GB) was elected President of Navarre on 20 July 2015 with the support of the EH Bildu, Podemos-Ahal Dugu and Izquierda-Ezkerra.

Óscar Arizcuren (UPN) resigned as Second Secretary on 2 February 2018 after being appointed Director of Public Policies and Relations with Europe for Aeropuertos Españoles y Navegación Aérea (AENA). His replacement Maribel García (UPN) was elected on 8 February 2018.

Deaths and resignations
The 9th parliament saw the following deaths and resignations:
 27 July 2015 - Manu Aierdi (GB) resigned after being appointed First Vice President and Minister for Economic Development of Navarre. He was replaced by Consuelo Satrustegi (GB) on 29 July 2015.
 13 August 2015 - Xabi Lasa (EHB) resigned after being appointed Director-General of Local Administration at the Department of Rural Development, Environment and Local Administration of Navarre. He was replaced by Aranzazu Izurdiaga (EHB) on 19 August 2015.
 29 December 2015 - Eduardo Santos (Podemos) resigned after being elected to the Congress of Deputies. He was replaced by Rubén Velasco (Podemos) on 7 January 2016.
 8 September 2016 - María Solana (GB) resigned. She was replaced by Rafael Eraso (GB) on 15 September 2016.
 22 November 2016 - Fátima Andreo (Podemos) resigned. She was replaced by Fanny Carrillo (Podemos) on 5 December 2016.
 4 September 2017 - Santos Cerdán (PSN) resigned. He was replaced by María Ruiz (PSN) on 13 September 2017.
 15 June 2018 - Iñaki Iriarte (UPN) resigned. He was replaced by Mariano Herrero (UPN) on 21 June 2018.
 24 September 2018 - Cristina Altuna (UPN) resigned. She was replaced by Francisco Irízar (UPN).
 20 May 2019 - Carlos García (UPN), Concepción Ruiz (PSN) and Sergio Sayas (UPN) resigned after being elected to the Congress of Deputies. Alberto Catalán (UPN) resigned after being elected to the Senate of Spain.

Members

References
 
 

2015 establishments in Navarre
2019 disestablishments in Navarre
 
Parliament of Navarre